The 2008–09 Washington Wizards season was the 48th season of the franchise in the National Basketball Association (NBA). The Wizards began the season hoping to improve on their 43–39 record from the previous season, but failed and fell 24 games short. The team finished 2008–09 with a dismal 19–63 record that equalled their worst 82-game performance from the 2000–01 season, and failed to qualify for the playoffs for the first time since the 2003–04 season.

Key dates
 June 26: The 2008 NBA Draft took place in New York City, New York.
 July 1: The free agency period started.

Transactions
 June 30 - Re-signed forward Antawn Jamison to a 4-year, $50 million contract
 July 11 - Guard Roger Mason signed with the San Antonio Spurs
 July 13 - Re-signed guard Gilbert Arenas to a 6-year, $111 million contract
 September 23 - Signed guard Juan Dixon to a contract.
 December 10 - Traded guard Antonio Daniels to the New Orleans Hornets and a conditional first-round draft pick to the Memphis Grizzlies in a three-team deal in exchange for guards Mike James and Javaris Crittenton. Also waived guard Dee Brown

Draft picks

Roster

Regular season

Standings

Game log

|- bgcolor="#ffcccc"
| 1
| October 29
| New Jersey
| 
| Antawn Jamison, DeShawn Stevenson (14)
| Caron Butler (11)
| Caron Butler (5)
| Verizon Center20,173
| 0–1

|- bgcolor="#ffcccc"
| 2
| November 1
| @ Detroit
| 
| Antawn Jamison (24)
| Antawn Jamison (8)
| Caron Butler (6)
| The Palace of Auburn Hills22,076
| 0–2
|- bgcolor="#ffcccc"
| 3
| November 5
| @ Milwaukee
| 
| Caron Butler (27)
| Antawn Jamison (10)
| Juan Dixon, Antonio Daniels (4)
| Bradley Center13,895
| 0–3
|- bgcolor="#ffcccc"
| 4
| November 7
| New York
| 
| Caron Butler (30)
| Antawn Jamison (12)
| Juan Dixon (11)
| Verizon Center20,173
| 0–4
|- bgcolor="#ffcccc"
| 5
| November 8
| @ Orlando
| 
| Nick Young (20)
| JaVale McGee, Oleksiy Pecherov, Etan Thomas (6)
| Dee Brown (5)
| Amway Arena16,911
| 0–5
|- bgcolor="#bbffbb"
| 6
| November 12
| Utah
| 
| Caron Butler (27)
| JaVale McGee (11)
| Caron Butler (3)
| Verizon Center14,885
| 1–5
|- bgcolor="#ffcccc"
| 7
| November 14
| @ Miami
| 
| Antawn Jamison (15)
| Antawn Jamison (10)
| Juan Dixon (3)
| American Airlines Arena15,284
| 1–6
|- bgcolor="#ffcccc"
| 8
| November 18
| Miami
| 
| Antawn Jamison (25)
| Antawn Jamison, Caron Butler (12)
| Juan Dixon (5)
| Verizon Center15,102
| 1–7
|- bgcolor="#ffcccc"
| 9
| November 19
| @ Atlanta
| 
| Caron Butler (32)
| Antawn Jamison (11)
| DeShawn Stevenson (5)
| Philips Arena14,416
| 1–8
|- bgcolor="#ffcccc"
| 10
| November 21
| Houston
| 
| Antawn Jamison (27)
| Antawn Jamison (10)
| DeShawn Stevenson (7)
| Verizon Center20,173
| 1–9
|- bgcolor="#ffcccc"
| 11
| November 22
| @ New York
| 
| Antawn Jamison (29)
| Antawn Jamison (13)
| DeShawn Stevenson (8)
| Madison Square Garden19,763
| 1–10
|- bgcolor="#bbffbb"
| 12
| November 25
| Golden State
| 
| Caron Butler (35)
| Andray Blatche (12)
| DeShawn Stevenson (7)
| Verizon Center13,852
| 2–10
|- bgcolor="#ffcccc"
| 13
| November 27
| Orlando
| 
| Caron Butler (25)
| Antawn Jamison (12)
| Caron Butler, DeShawn Stevenson (6)
| Verizon Center13,295
| 2–11
|- bgcolor="#ffcccc"
| 14
| November 29
| Atlanta
| 
| Antawn Jamison (26)
| Antawn Jamison (13)
| Antawn Jamison, Caron Butler (5)
| Verizon Center18,110
| 2–12

|- bgcolor="#bbffbb"
| 15
| December 2
| @ New Jersey
| 
| Caron Butler, Antawn Jamison (22)
| Antawn Jamison (8)
| Caron Butler (10)
| Izod Center15,062
| 3–12
|- bgcolor="#ffcccc"
| 16
| December 3
| Portland
| 
| Antawn Jamison (22)
| JaVale McGee (7)
| Antawn Jamison (5)
| Verizon Center12,802
| 3–13
|- bgcolor="#ffcccc"
| 17
| December 5
| L.A. Lakers
| 
| Caron Butler (26)
| Andray Blatche, Antawn Jamison (12)
| DeShawn Stevenson (6)
| Verizon Center20,173
| 3–14
|- bgcolor="#ffcccc"
| 18
| December 6
| @ Chicago
| 
| Caron Butler (27)
| Antawn Jamison (12)
| Caron Butler (6)
| United Center21,741
| 3–15
|- bgcolor="#bbffbb"
| 19
| December 9
| Detroit
| 
| Caron Butler (33)
| Antawn Jamison (11)
| Juan Dixon (7)
| Verizon Center14,707
| 4–15
|- bgcolor="#ffcccc"
| 20
| December 11
| Boston
| 
| Caron Butler (19)
| JaVale McGee (6)
| Juan Dixon (7)
| Verizon Center20,173
| 4–16
|- bgcolor="#ffcccc"
| 21
| December 13
| @ Philadelphia
| 
| Antawn Jamison (17)
| Antawn Jamison (9)
| Juan Dixon (5)
| Wachovia Center15,865
| 4–17
|- bgcolor="#ffcccc"
| 22
| December 15
| Indiana
| 
| Antawn Jamison, Caron Butler (26)
| Antawn Jamison (15)
| Mike James (6)
| Verizon Center14,502
| 4–18
|- bgcolor="#ffcccc"
| 23
| December 17
| @ Detroit
| 
| Mike James (16)
| Antawn Jamison, Andray Blatche (11)
| Andray Blatche, Caron Butler (4)
| The Palace of Auburn Hills22,076
| 4–19
|- bgcolor="#ffcccc"
| 24
| December 19
| Philadelphia
| 
| Antawn Jamison (23)
| Antawn Jamison (10)
| Antawn Jamison (5)
| Verizon Center18,323
| 4–20
|- bgcolor="#ffcccc"
| 25
| December 21
| Dallas
| 
| Antawn Jamison (22)
| Mike James, Antawn Jamison (8)
| Mike James (5)
| Verizon Center15,582
| 4–21
|- bgcolor="#ffcccc"
| 26
| December 23
| @ Charlotte
| 
| Caron Butler (31)
| Dominic McGuire (10)
| Caron Butler (4)
| Time Warner Cable Arena13,776
| 4–22
|- bgcolor="#ffcccc"
| 27
| December 25
| @ Cleveland
| 
| Antawn Jamison (28)
| Dominic McGuire (11)
| Caron Butler (10)
| Quicken Loans Arena20,562
| 4–23
|- bgcolor="#bbffbb"
| 28
| December 27
| Oklahoma City
| 
| Antawn Jamison (29)
| Andray Blatche (15)
| Mike James (11)
| Verizon Center16,181
| 5–23
|- bgcolor="#bbffbb"
| 29
| December 29
| @ Houston
| 
| Antawn Jamison (30)
| Antawn Jamison (12)
| Dominic McGuire (6)
| Toyota Center18,278
| 6–23
|- bgcolor="#ffcccc"
| 30
| December 30
| @ New Orleans
| 
| Antawn Jamison (22)
| Antawn Jamison (12)
| Mike James (7)
| New Orleans Arena18,021
| 6–24

|- bgcolor="#ffcccc"
| 31
| January 2
| @ Boston
| 
| Nick Young (15)
| Antawn Jamison (9)
| Caron Butler (5)
| TD Banknorth Garden18,624
| 6–25
|- bgcolor="#bbffbb"
| 32
| January 4
| Cleveland
| 
| Antawn Jamison (26)
| Antawn Jamison (13)
| Andray Blatche (4)
| Verizon Center20,173
| 7–25
|- bgcolor="#ffcccc"
| 33
| January 6
| @ Orlando
| 
| Caron Butler (29)
| Antawn Jamison (9)
| Caron Butler, Mike James (5)
| Amway Arena16,011
| 7–26
|- bgcolor="#ffcccc"
| 34
| January 7
| Toronto
| 
| Antawn Jamison (32)
| Antawn Jamison (7)
| Caron Butler, Javaris Crittenton (6)
| Verizon Center13,864
| 7–27
|- bgcolor="#ffcccc"
| 35
| January 9
| @ Chicago
| 
| Nick Young (28)
| Antawn Jamison (11)
| Caron Butler (6)
| United Center20,125
| 7–28
|- bgcolor="#ffcccc"
| 36
| January 10
| Charlotte
| 
| Caron Butler (19)
| Andray Blatche (10)
| Andray Blatche (4)
| Verizon Center20,173
| 7–29
|- bgcolor="#ffcccc"
| 37
| January 12
| Milwaukee
| 
| Nick Young (30)
| Dominic McGuire (10)
| Dominic McGuire (5)
| Verizon Center13,510
| 7–30
|- bgcolor="#ffcccc"
| 38
| January 14
| @ New York
| 
| Nick Young (33)
| Antawn Jamison (7)
| Mike James (5)
| Madison Square Garden18,020
| 7–31
|- bgcolor="#bbffbb"
| 39
| January 16
| New York
| 
| Antawn Jamison (28)
| Andray Blatche (11)
| Caron Butler (7)
| Verizon Center17,526
| 8–31
|- bgcolor="#ffcccc"
| 40
| January 19
| @ Golden State
| 
| Andray Blatche, Antawn Jamison, Caron Butler (22)
| Dominic McGuire (11)
| Dominic McGuire (6)
| Oracle Arena19,244
| 8–32
|- bgcolor="#bbffbb"
| 41
| January 21
| @ Sacramento
| 
| Antawn Jamison (33)
| Dominic McGuire (12)
| Caron Butler (5)
| ARCO Arena10,821
| 9–32
|- bgcolor="#ffcccc"
| 42
| January 22
| @ L.A. Lakers
| 
| Antawn Jamison (19)
| JaVale McGee (9)
| Caron Butler, Mike James (6)
| Staples Center18,997
| 9–33
|- bgcolor="#ffcccc"
| 43
| January 24
| @ Portland
| 
| Caron Butler (31)
| Caron Butler (10)
| Mike James (7)
| Rose Garden20,566
| 9–34
|- bgcolor="#ffcccc"
| 44
| January 26
| Phoenix
| 
| Caron Butler (28)
| Antawn Jamison (13)
| Dominic McGuire (7)
| Verizon Center17,344
| 9–35
|- bgcolor="#ffcccc"
| 45
| January 28
| @ Miami
| 
| Antawn Jamison (21)
| Antawn Jamison (12)
| Caron Butler (6)
| American Airlines Arena16,424
| 9–36
|- bgcolor="#ffcccc"
| 46
| January 30
| @ Philadelphia
| 
| Antawn Jamison (25)
| Antawn Jamison (15)
| Javaris Crittenton (7)
| Wachovia Center15,528
| 9–37
|- bgcolor="#bbffbb"
| 47
| January 31
| L.A. Clippers
| 
| Antawn Jamison (25)
| Caron Butler (13)
| Caron Butler (7)
| Verizon Center18,227
| 10–37

|- bgcolor="#ffcccc"
| 48
| February 2
| Memphis
| 
| Antawn Jamison (29)
| Antawn Jamison (13)
| Caron Butler (5)
| Verizon Center11,442
| 10–38
|- bgcolor="#ffcccc"
| 49
| February 4
| New Jersey
| 
| Nick Young (21)
| Antawn Jamison (6)
| Nick Young (4)
| Verizon Center12,602
| 10–39
|- bgcolor="#ffcccc"
| 50
| February 6
| Denver
| 
| Antawn Jamison (26)
| Dominic McGuire, Antawn Jamison (8)
| Javaris Crittenton (7)
| Verizon Center20,173
| 10–40
|- bgcolor="#bbffbb"
| 51
| February 8
| Indiana
| 
| Caron Butler (35)
| Caron Butler (13)
| Mike James (7)
| Verizon Center13,708
| 11–40
|- bgcolor="#ffcccc"
| 52
| February 10
| @ Atlanta
| 
| Caron Butler (22)
| Antawn Jamison (12)
| Javaris Crittenton (7)
| Philips Arena17,027
| 11–41
|- bgcolor="#ffcccc"
| 53
| February 11
| @ Charlotte
| 
| Caron Butler (26)
| Antawn Jamison (9)
| Caron Butler (6)
| Time Warner Cable Arena10,237
| 11–42
|- bgcolor="#bbffbb"
| 54
| February 17
| Minnesota
| 
| Antawn Jamison (29)
| Antawn Jamison (11)
| Caron Butler (6)
| Verizon Center11,623
| 12–42
|- bgcolor="#bbffbb"
| 55
| February 20
| @ New Jersey
| 
| Antawn Jamison (28)
| Dominic McGuire (14)
| Dominic McGuire, Javaris Crittenton, Andray Blatche (3)
| Izod Center15,113
| 13–42
|- bgcolor="#ffcccc"
| 56
| February 21
| San Antonio
| 
| Caron Butler (24)
| Caron Butler, Antawn Jamison (7)
| Dominic McGuire, Caron Butler (4)
| Verizon Center20,173
| 13–43
|- bgcolor="#ffcccc"
| 57
| February 25
| Philadelphia
| 
| Caron Butler (17)
| Dominic McGuire (14)
| Caron Butler (5)
| Verizon Center16,505
| 13–44
|- bgcolor="#bbffbb"
| 58
| February 27
| Chicago
| 
| Antawn Jamison (27)
| Dominic McGuire, Antawn Jamison (11)
| Caron Butler (6)
| Verizon Center18,114
| 14–44
|- bgcolor="#ffcccc"
| 59
| February 28
| @ Milwaukee
| 
| Antawn Jamison (21)
| Antawn Jamison (14)
| Caron Butler (6)
| Bradley Center15,970
| 14–45

|- bgcolor="#ffcccc"
| 60
| March 2
| Atlanta
| 
| Antawn Jamison (23)
| Antawn Jamison, JaVale McGee (9)
| Dominic McGuire (9)
| Verizon Center10,189
| 14–46
|- bgcolor="#ffcccc"
| 61
| March 4
| @ Oklahoma City
| 
| Antawn Jamison (29)
| Antawn Jamison (10)
| Dominic McGuire (6)
| Ford Center18,576
| 14–47
|- bgcolor="#ffcccc"
| 62
| March 6
| @ San Antonio
| 
| Antawn Jamison (14)
| Nick Young (6)
| Dominic McGuire (4)
| AT&T Center18,440
| 14–48
|- bgcolor="#ffcccc"
| 63
| March 7
| @ Dallas
| 
| Antawn Jamison (24)
| Antawn Jamison (11)
| Mike James (7)
| American Airlines Center20,150
| 14–49
|- bgcolor="#bbffbb"
| 64
| March 9
| @ Minnesota
| 
| Caron Butler (27)
| Caron Butler (10)
| Caron Butler (6)
| Target Center13,119
| 15–49
|- bgcolor="#ffcccc"
| 65
| March 11
| New Orleans
| 
| Antawn Jamison (25)
| Antawn Jamison (10)
| Caron Butler (9)
| Verizon Center15,255
| 15–50
|- bgcolor="#ffcccc"
| 66
| March 13
| Orlando
| 
| Antawn Jamison (36)
| Dominic McGuire (7)
| Javaris Crittenton (7)
| Verizon Center18,152
| 15–51
|- bgcolor="#bbffbb"
| 67
| March 15
| Sacramento
| 
| Antawn Jamison (30)
| Antawn Jamison (9)
| Dominic McGuire (8)
| Verizon Center15,108
| 16–51
|- bgcolor="#ffcccc"
| 68
| March 17
| @ Utah
| 
| Nick Young, Juan Dixon (14)
| Andray Blatche (13)
| Darius Songaila (3)
| EnergySolutions Arena19,911
| 16–52
|- bgcolor="#ffcccc"
| 69
| March 18
| @ L.A. Clippers
| 
| Antawn Jamison (24)
| Antawn Jamison (11)
| Antawn Jamison (7)
| Staples Center15,123
| 16–53
|- bgcolor="#ffcccc"
| 70
| March 20
| @ Denver
| 
| Antawn Jamison (27)
| JaVale McGee (11)
| Mike James (9)
| Pepsi Center18,231
| 16–54
|- bgcolor="#ffcccc"
| 71
| March 21
| @ Phoenix
| 
| Antawn Jamison (25)
| Andray Blatche (9)
| Darius Songaila (3)
| US Airways Center18,422
| 16–55
|- bgcolor="#ffcccc"
| 72
| March 23
| Chicago
| 
| Antawn Jamison (34)
| Andray Blatche (13)
| Dominic McGuire (7)
| Verizon Center15,421
| 16–56
|- bgcolor="#bbffbb"
| 73
| March 25
| Charlotte
| 
| Antawn Jamison (27)
| Antawn Jamison (8)
| Mike James (5)
| Verizon Center14,657
| 17–56
|- bgcolor="#ffcccc"
| 74
| March 28
| Detroit
| 
| Antawn Jamison (21)
| Caron Butler (10)
| Gilbert Arenas (10)
| Verizon Center20,173
| 17–57
|- bgcolor="#ffcccc"
| 75
| March 29
| @ Indiana
| 
| Caron Butler (31)
| Caron Butler (13)
| Javaris Crittenton, Caron Butler (3)
| Conseco Fieldhouse13,729
| 17–58

|- bgcolor="#ffcccc"
| 76
| April 1
| @ Memphis
| 
| Caron Butler (31)
| Javaris Crittenton (11)
| Caron Butler (4)
| FedExForum10,013
| 17–59
|- bgcolor="#bbffbb"
| 77
| April 2
| Cleveland
| 
| Caron Butler (25)
| Brendan Haywood, Dominic McGuire (10)
| Gilbert Arenas (10)
| Verizon Center20,173
| 18–59
|- bgcolor="#ffcccc"
| 78
| April 4
| Miami
| 
| Caron Butler (27)
| Brendan Haywood (12)
| Javaris Crittenton (8)
| Verizon Center20,173
| 18–60
|- bgcolor="#ffcccc"
| 79
| April 8
| @ Cleveland
| 
| Nick Young (16)
| Brendan Haywood (7)
| Dominic McGuire (4)
| Quicken Loans Arena20,562
| 18–61
|- bgcolor="#bbffbb"
| 80
| April 10
| @ Toronto
| 
| Antawn Jamison (24)
| Antawn Jamison (12)
| Caron Butler (7)
| Air Canada Centre18,107
| 19–61
|- bgcolor="#ffcccc"
| 81
| April 13
| Toronto
| 
| Caron Butler (28)
| Caron Butler, Dominic McGuire (9)
| Juan Dixon (7)
| Verizon Center18,455
| 19–62
|-bgcolor="#ffcccc"
| 82
| April 15
| @ Boston
| 
| Caron Butler (39)
| Oleksiy Pecherov (10)
| Caron Butler, Javaris Crittenton (4)
| TD Banknorth Garden18,624
| 19–63

Playoffs
Did not qualify

Player statistics

Season

Transactions

Trades

References

Washington Wizards seasons
Washington
Wash
Wash